Dmitry Flis, (in , born October 10, 1984 in Kaliningrad) is a Russian professional basketball player who plays for Ciclista Olimpico in the Liga Nacional de Basquet in Argentina.

Honours 
DKV Joventut
 FIBA EuroCup: (1)
 2005–06
 ULEB Cup: (1)
 2007–08
 Copa del Rey: (1)
 2008
 Lliga Catalana: (1)
 2005

Plus Pujol Lleida
 LEB Catalan League Champion: (1)
 2008

External links
 Official CB Lleida website
 Dmitri Flis on Twitter

1984 births
Living people
Bàsquet Manresa players
CB Prat players
Joventut Badalona players
Liga ACB players
Obradoiro CAB players
Russian men's basketball players
Russian expatriate basketball people in Spain
Power forwards (basketball)